The 2019 Citrus Bowl was a college football bowl game that was played on January 1, 2019. It was the 73rd edition of what is now the Citrus Bowl, and was one of the 2018–19 bowl games concluding the 2018 FBS football season. Sponsored by VRBO, a vacation rental marketplace owned by HomeAway, the game was officially known as the VRBO Citrus Bowl.

Teams
The game was played between the Penn State Nittany Lions of the Big Ten Conference and the Kentucky Wildcats of the Southeastern Conference. The teams had previously met five times, with Penn State holding a 3–2 edge; their most recent meeting was the 1999 Outback Bowl, won by Penn State.

Penn State Nittany Lions

Penn State received and accepted a bid to the Citrus Bowl on December 2. The Nittany Lions entered the bowl with a 9–3 record (6–3 in conference).

Kentucky Wildcats

Kentucky received and accepted a bid to the Citrus Bowl on December 2. The Wildcats entered the bowl with a 9–3 record (5–3 in conference).

Game summary

Scoring summary

Statistics

References

External links
 Box score at ESPN

Citrus Bowl
Citrus Bowl (game)
2018 Citrus
2018 Citrus
Citrus Bowl
Citrus Bowl